Nova Veneza can refer to two towns in Brazil:
Nova Veneza, Goiás, a small town in Goiás state
Nova Veneza, Santa Catarina, a small town in Santa Catarina state